Nicholas Theocarakis, also transcribed as Nikos Theocharakis (born 1956), is a Greek economist and professor of economics at Athens University. He is the author of several books and contributions on economic theory and history of economic thought.

In March 2015, he was appointed General Secretary of Fiscal Policy leading the technical negotiations of the Greek Ministry of Finance with the Eurogroup. At the end of April, PM Alexis Tsipras made changes in the negotiation team.

Early life and education
Born 1956, Theocharakis visited the Varvakeio model high school in Athens, receiving his diploma in 1974. He studied Economics at the National and Kapodistrian University of Athens and at the Churchill College of Cambridge University, where he graduated in 1979. At Cambridge University he would later also complete his doctoral thesis in economics.

Career
Since 1988 Theocharakis has been teaching political economy and History of economic thought. Previously an assistant professor, in 2013 he was promoted to the status of an associated professor at the Department of Economics of Athens University. He has served twice as the director of the Political Economy division. Before his appointment as Secretary General he has served as director of UADPhilEcon, the doctoral program in economics of the University of Athens and as the Faculty of Economic and Social Sciences representative to the University of Athens Research Committee.

Previously Theocarakis had also worked in the private sector and served as a board member at the Emporiki Bank, Egnatia Bank and Ethniki Asfalistiki. Before his appointment as assistant professor at the Department of Economics of the University of Athens he worked as Deputy Managing Director of Nic. J. Theocarakis S.A.

An academic colleague, regular co-author and confidant of Greek ex-Minister of Finance Yanis Varoufakis, Theocharakis on 4 March 2015 was appointed the ministry's new Secretary General for Fiscal Policy. Until the end of April 2015 he was in charge of the negotiations in the Brussels Group and the Ministry of Finance representative in the Eurogroup Working Group. He resigned from the position of Secretary General for Fiscal Policy in October 2015. From late October 2015 he is the Scientific Director and Chairman of KEPE (Centre of Planning and Economic Research). He resigned his position in July 2019 and he was replaced by Prof. P. Liargovas in October 2019. In February 2016 he was appointed by the Ministry of Culture Chairman of the Board of Directors of Megaron-The Athens Concert Hall.

Selected publications
 English monograph
 

 English contributions
 
 [ "The dissemination of economic thought in South-Eastern Europe in the nineteenth century"] (with Michalis M. Psalidopoulos). In: Heinz-Dieter Kurz et al.: The Dissemination of Economic Ideas. Edward Elgar, 2011, . pp. 161–191.
 
 
 
 

 Greek monographs

References

External links
 Publications at ResearchGate

1956 births
Living people
21st-century Greek economists
National and Kapodistrian University of Athens alumni
Alumni of the University of Cambridge
Academic staff of the National and Kapodistrian University of Athens
Greek government-debt crisis
People from Athens
20th-century Greek economists